The Philadelphia Flyers are a professional ice hockey team based in Philadelphia, Pennsylvania. They are members of the Metropolitan Division of the National Hockey League's (NHL) Eastern Conference. The Flyers were founded in 1967 as one of six expansion teams, increasing the size of the NHL at that time to 12 teams.

Since the franchise was established, the team has had 23 head coaches, including Fred Shero, who coached the Flyers to two Stanley Cups in 1974 and 1975, and was the inaugural winner of the Jack Adams Award in 1973–74. Three other Flyers coaches have won the Adams Award — Pat Quinn in 1979–80, Mike Keenan in 1984–85, and Bill Barber in 2000–01. The Flyers current head coach is John Tortorella.

Key

Coaches
Note: Statistics are updated through the end of the  season

See also
List of NHL head coaches

Notes

References
General

 

Specific

 
head coaches
Philadelphia Flyers head coaches